Machurucuto is a coastal town in Miranda State, Venezuela.

See also 
 Machurucuto Incident

Populated places in Miranda (state)